The following highways are numbered 123:

Australia 
 - Now  Newcastle Inner City Bypass

Brazil
 SP-123 (Rodovia Floriano Rodrigues Pinheiro)

Canada
 New Brunswick Route 123
 Ontario Highway 123 (former)
 Prince Edward Island Route 123
 Saskatchewan Highway 123

Costa Rica
 National Route 123

India
 National Highway 123 (India) (NH 123) in the states of Rajasthan and Uttar Pradesh

Japan
 Japan National Route 123

Malaysia
 Malaysia Federal Route 123 (Jalan Rasau Kerteh Selatan), Terengganu, Malaysia

Mexico
 Mexican Federal Highway 123 (Carretera Federal 123)

Spain
 N-123 road (Spain)

United States
 U.S. Route 123
 U.S. Route 123 (Kentucky) (former)
 Alabama State Route 123
 Arkansas Highway 123
 California State Route 123
 Connecticut Route 123
 Florida State Road 123
 County Road 123 (Baker County, Florida)
 Georgia State Route 123
 Hawaii Route 123 (former)
 Illinois Route 123
 Indiana State Road 123 (former)
 Iowa Highway 123 (former)
 K-123 (Kansas highway)
 Kentucky Route 123
 Louisiana Highway 123
 Maine State Route 123
 Maryland Route 123 (former)
 Massachusetts Route 123
 M-123 (Michigan highway)
 Minnesota State Highway 123
 Missouri Route 123
 New Hampshire Route 123
 New Hampshire Route 123A
 County Route 123 (Bergen County, New Jersey)
 New York State Route 123
 County Route 123 (Jefferson County, New York)
 County Route 123 (Niagara County, New York)
 North Carolina Highway 123
 Ohio State Route 123
 Oklahoma State Highway 123
 Pennsylvania Route 123 (former)
 Rhode Island Route 123
 South Dakota Highway 123
 Tennessee State Route 123
 Texas State Highway 123
 Texas State Highway Loop 123
 Farm to Market Road 123
 Utah State Route 123
 Vermont Route 123
 Virginia State Route 123
 Virginia State Route 123 (1923-1928) (former)
 Virginia State Route 123 (1928-1933) (former)
 Virginia State Route 123 (1933-1940) (former)
 Washington State Route 123
 West Virginia Route 123
 Wisconsin Highway 123

Territories
 Puerto Rico Highway 123